A Few Miles from Memphis is the first album with pianist Harold Mabern as leader. It was recorded in 1968 and released on the Prestige label in the same year.

Reception

In his review for Allmusic, Ronnie D. Lankford, Jr. calls the album "a bluesy, rhythm-filled set".

Track listing 
All compositions by Harold Mabern except as noted
 "A Few Miles From Memphis" - 5:30   
 "Walkin' Back" - 5:52   
 "A Treat For Bea" - 6:08   
 "Syden Blue" - 4:00   
 "There's a Kind of Hush" (Geoff Stephens, Les Reed) - 5:35   
 "B & B" - 7:27   
 "To Wane" - 6:24

Personnel 
Harold Mabern - piano
George Coleman, Buddy Terry - tenor saxophone
Bill Lee - bass
Walter Perkins  - drums

References 

Harold Mabern albums
1968 albums
Prestige Records albums
Albums produced by Cal Lampley
Albums recorded at Van Gelder Studio